Go to Hell may refer to:

Film and television
 "Go to Hell" (CSI), an episode of the TV series CSI: Crime Scene Investigation
 "Go to Hell" (American Horror Story), an episode of the TV series American Horror Story
 Go to Hell!!, a 1997 Australian animated film
 Band Toh Baje Ga, a 2018 Pakistani television film, previously titled Go To Hell

Graphic novels
 Bill & Ted Go to Hell, a 2017 graphic novel
 Rick and Morty Go to Hell, a 2020 graphic novel

Music
 Go to Hell (EP), an EP by Vader
 "Go to Hell" (Carcass song)
 "Go to Hell" (Clinton Kane song)
 "Go to Hell" (Empress Of song)
 "Go to Hell" (Megadeth song)
 "Go to Hell" (Motörhead song)
 "Go to Hell", a song by Alice Cooper from Alice Cooper Goes to Hell
 "Go to Hell", a song by David Ford from Songs for the Road
 "Go to Hell", a song by Dolly Parton from For God and Country
 "Go to Hell", a song by Go Radio from Close the Distance
 "Go to Hell!", a song by GWAR from Beyond Hell
 "Go to Hell", a song by KMFDM from Naïve
 "Go to Hell", a song by Nina Simone from Silk & Soul

See also
 Going to Hell (disambiguation)